John L. Mack is an American sound engineer. He was nominated for an Academy Award in the category Best Sound for the film The Hindenburg. Mack was also nominated for two Primetime Emmy Awards in the category Outstanding Sound Mixing for his work on the television program The Wonder Years.

Selected filmography
 The Hindenburg (1975; co-nominated with Leonard Peterson, John A. Bolger Jr. and Don Sharpless)

References

External links

Year of birth missing (living people)
Possibly living people
American audio engineers
20th-century American engineers